Bernard Kevin McGrath (born 22 May 1947) is a convicted child sex abuser and former member of the Catholic religious order the Brothers Hospitallers of St John of God. He is considered to be the most notorious offender in the most notorious religious order in Australia. His victims include orphans, children with intellectual and physical disabilities and homeless children in Australia and New Zealand.

McGrath has been convicted of child sexual abuse on five occasions in Australia and New Zealand and is currently being held at the South Coast Correctional Centre, Nowra, New South Wales.

Early life and career 
Bernard McGrath was born in Christchurch, New Zealand. He grew up with his parents, one brother and one sister. McGrath's father was a butcher by trade but had previously worked as a cleric and was determined his son would follow a life of service to the church. McGrath studied at Xavier College, Christchurch, and despite wanting to study veterinary science, six months after leaving school he joined the Brothers Hospitallers of St John of God when he was 18 years old. In 1967, he spent six months as a postulate studying and working at Kendall Grange, Morisset, New South Wales.

In early 1968, McGrath took his vows of poverty, obedience, chastity and hospitality. He remained at Kendall Grange until 1969.

In early 1969, McGrath moved to Burswood and became a scholastic, working in psychiatric wards. Despite a desire to become a nurse, he enrolled at a teachers' college at Oak Hill and was awarded a Diploma of Teaching. During this time, he reported that he was involved in a sexual relationship with Brother Berchmans Moynahan.

In 1972, McGrath was transferred to the order's school in Churinga, Victoria, and placed in charge of a classroom program. In 1973, he was transferred back to Kendall Grange, where he worked as a teacher for one year.

Maryland's School, Christchurch 
In 1974, McGrath completed his training and was transferred to Marylands School, Christchurch for children with learning and behavioural difficulties. McGrath worked there as a dormitory master and teacher. He would later allege a culture of violence, fear, sexual abuse and concealment. The prior at the school was Brother Roger Moloney, who would also later be convicted of child sexual abuse at the school.

McGrath later told police that Moloney had threatened McGrath's progress in the order unless he acceded to sexual demands made of him. Sexual contact occurred between McGrath and Moloney.

In mid-1977, the provincial of the order, Brother Brain O'Donnell, received written complaints about McGrath and Moloney offending against children. In September 1977, despite knowledge of this offending, McGrath was transferred to Australia and sent to Kendall Grange, another school for disadvantaged children. A month later, Moloney was transferred to Rome, where he worked for a year as a pharmacist in the Vatican.

Kendall Grange 
McGrath became headmaster of Kendall Grange in 1981. The school was a boarding school for boys aged between 8 and 15 who suffered from behavioural, emotional or intellectual problems. The brothers of the order ran the school with the assistance of various lay staff. Around 300 boys lived at the school at any time, housed in dormitories. Between four and ten brothers resided at Kendall Grange at any one time and a brother was allocated to a dormitory or section. He was directly responsible for the care and welfare of the boys under his supervision. McGrath was in charge of red section and assumed the role of prior principal. He held this role between 1980 and 1986, which was the period that saw the majority of his offending. McGrath sexually abused scores of children at Kendall Grange, including Jason Van Dyke.

In 1986, McGrath left Kendall Grange to establish the Hebron Trust, a residential program in Christchurch for troubled teenagers and young adults. In his role at Hebron Trust, he had direct contact with the District Police Commander's Office and Youth Aid. At Hebron, McGrath again had access to vulnerable children.

In 1991, two social workers complained to the order's leadership that McGrath was making sexual advances towards four children in their care. When they received no response, they reported their suspicions to Christchurch police.

In 1992, Jason Van Dyke's mother, Janice, personally reported her son's sexual abuse by McGrath to Brother Joseph Smith. Smith admitted he had received another complaint about McGrath six months earlier but assured Janice "Don't worry, we are dealing with it."

Father Brian Lucas 
In 1992, Brother Joseph Smith brought McGrath to St Mary's Cathedral, Sydney, where they had a meeting with Father Brian Lucas. At this time, Lucas was leading the Australian Catholic church's response to the emerging scandal of child sexual abuse by priests.

As a civil lawyer and capable priest, Lucas established the church's Special Issues Resources Group responsible for dealing with allegations of child sexual abuse against clergy. Lucas gave evidence to the royal commission that his role was to help the bishop or major superior "manage the person making the complaint, see that their needs were met and get the offender out of the business".

Over the course of his career, Lucas met and interviewed over 30 abusive priests and religious, including Father Denis McAlinden, Father John Farrell, Father John Nestor and McGrath. Lucas took no notes of these meetings, despite the priests confessing to sexually abusing children in their care. He reported none of the offending to the police.

During the meeting at St Mary's Cathedral, McGrath confessed to Lucas that he had sexually abused children and there would be many more complaints. Despite this admission, neither Lucas or Smith reported McGrath to police. In 2019, Lucas acknowledged the meeting took place but said he was not obliged to report McGrath to the police. Lucas denied his failure to report the child sexual abuse to the police was a cover-up.

Jemez Springs 
Shortly after the Lucas meeting, Brother Joseph Smith accompanied McGrath to Jemez Springs, a treatment centre run by the Catholic order the Congregation of the Servants of the Paraclete for sexually abusive clergy and religious in New Mexico, United States. At least one other Australian Catholic priest was sent to Jemez Springs, the Ballarat offender Father Gerald Ridsdale.

During 1993–94, McGrath took part in the Jamaica program, a six month residential treatment for religious personnel who had committed sexual offences against children. During this course, McGrath was required to identify all the children he had sexually abused. None of this information was ever reported to police. McGrath was treated by Sarah Brennan, who stated McGrath surpassed all other clients in the program.

After leaving the program, McGrath moved to Chicago and stayed with other members of his order. During this time, McGrath was notified by Smith that police wanted to question him over multiple allegations of child sexual abuse. Smith offered McGrath the chance to remain in the United States, but in late 1993 he returned to New Zealand to be interviewed about his alleged abuse of two boys at Marylands and four altar boys associated with the life skills course at Hebron Trust.

Convictions and imprisonment 

On 23 December 1993, McGrath pled guilty and was sentenced in the High Court of New Zealand to three years' imprisonment. While serving this sentence, he admitted offences upon three more students from Marylands. He also participated in the Kia Marama Sexual Offenders Program in Rolleston Prison.

In 1995, he was granted parole and started his own cleaning business. He also commenced a psychology program through North Carolina University.

During 1995, Jason Van Dyke made a statement to Chatswood police alleging that McGrath had sexually abused him at Kendall Grange between 1982 and 1983. McGrath was extradited to Australia and on 30 January 1997 pleaded guilty to all six charges relating to Van Dyke. McGrath was sentenced to nine months' imprisonment. In October 1997, McGrath was released from jail and returned to New Zealand and was discharged from the St John of God order.

Following publicity around McGrath's conviction, more allegations emerged and in 2003 and McGrath was again arrested by Christchurch police. He agreed to a six-hour interview with Detective Sean Buckley. The arrest resulted in a number of charges and an indictment containing 54 counts of sexual abuse upon multiple complainants.

During that time, five other members of the order, Brother Roger Moloney, Brother Raymond Garchow, Brother William Lebler and Brother Rodger Mount all faced child sexual abuse allegations.

In 2006, McGrath was found guilty on 21 charges of child sexual abuse against nine victims aged between 7 and 15 years old. He was sentenced to five years' imprisonment. In 2008, as McGrath was released on parole, Brother Roger Moloney was sentenced to two years and nine months on seven counts of sexual abuse of children at Marylands.

Following the devastating Christchurch earthquake, McGrath moved to Ashburton and took on the role of care-taker for a 20 acre farm. He then set up a tea business and travelled to Sri Lanka.

In late 2010, Strike Force Lozano was established by NSW Police to investigate more allegations of child sex abuse at Kendall Grange. Detective Darren Webster led the investigation and by the end of 2011, had a significant brief on McGrath and Brother John Clegg. Other brothers who allegedly committed other offences at the school were deceased or deemed unfit to be tried. In 2012, McGrath was charged again in relation to the new Kendall Grange allegations.

In 2012, Interpol put out an extradition request for McGrath, who travelled from Sri Lanka to Christchurch. He appealed his extradition to Australia and continued to fight in the courts for two years. The New Zealand High Court finally dismissed the appeal and on 23 December 2014 he was extradited to Australia.

As McGrath arrived in Australia, Brother Rodger Mount was deported from Papua New Guinea. He was arrested by Australian police on arrival, facing charges from four victims.

On 16 May 2017, McGrath's fourth trial began in the District Court of New South Wales. He was arraigned before an expanded jury of 15 on an indictment containing 129 counts, principally of a sexual nature against 15 victims. Due to the high number of complainants, the trial was split into two.

On 16 February 2018, McGrath was sentenced to 33 years' imprisonment for 64 offences against 12 boys at Kendall Grange. The second trial began in 2019 and he was sentenced to a further 29 years' imprisonment for offences against 15 boys at Kendall Grange.

In her sentencing remarks, Judge Sarah Huggett said that she had "no doubt at all that systemic abuse of children at Kendall Grange was taking place during the period of McGrath's offending". Hugget also said: "I found the offender to be a most unpersuasive, manipulative and unconvincing witness" and "not a witness of truth". She added: "The undeniable fact remains that this offender knowingly engaged in a deliberate course of prolonged and serious sexual abuse. He completely disregarded and exploited the powerlessness and vulnerability of his victims for his own motivations. He appreciated the wrongfulness of his conduct and on many occasions used techniques to secure a victim's silence. The offender as an educated adult must have appreciated the harm at least his more serious offences were causing. Yet he acted with complete disregard for those inevitable consequences...it must be remembered that he committed so many offences upon 12 victims over many years. He was a predator and there was no sign he was stopping as he moved from one victim to the next."

Cover-up 
The cover-up of McGrath's crimes began more than 20 years before he was finally arrested. In 1977, reports of McGrath's abuse of children reached Brother Brian O'Donnell, the head of the order in Sydney. At least one other brother, a teacher and several members of staff reported their concerns to O'Donnell. Following a short internal investigation and despite serious allegations of child sexual abuse, O'Donnell transferred McGrath to Kendall Grange in New South Wales. Like Marylands, Kendall Grange was a school for disadvantaged boys. In 1980, McGrath became headmaster of the school and buy his own admissions, his offending increased significantly.

When more allegations emerged in the early 1990s, the order's provincial, Brother Joseph Smith, followed Catholic Church protocol and took McGrath to meet Father Brian Lucas, a priest and civil lawyer. Lucas was head of the  church's Special Issues Resource Group tasked with responding to the emerging scandal of child sex abuse by priests and brothers.

Lucas, Smith and McGrath met at St Mary's Cathedral in Sydney and McGrath confessed to Lucas that he was an abuser. Following the meeting, Smith accompanied McGrath to the United States for treatment. Despite McGrath's confession, neither Lucas or Smith reported him to the police. Instead, McGrath was moved out of Australia in an attempt to avoid scandal.

McGrath's trials

Government inquiries

Victorian parliamentary inquiry 
On 29 April 2013, Brother Timothy Graham, the provincial of the Hospitaller Order of St John of God, Oceania province, gave evidence before the Victorian Parliamentary Inquiry Into The Handling of Child Abuse by Religious and Other Organisations. He was asked about Brother Brian O'Donnell, the provincial of the order in 1977. O'Donnell was quoted as saying that "... no allegations of sexual misconduct involving brothers ... was ever documented and would be held in archives. This practice was followed in order to deal with the situation in its actual context without compromising the good name of the person in the future. By that I am referring to the brother against whom the allegation had been made." O'Donnell was also quoted as saying "... I made mention in my earlier statement to police that the attitude within the order was one of reacting to a religious failing to keep his vow of chastity. We were dealing with a sin rather than a crime. The attitude was that a sinner can repent and be forgiven and give up sinning."

O'Donnell's police statement makes reference to his decision to move McGrath and Moloney in 1977: "... as a result of the number of allegations received in and around this time that I as provincial saw the need for a clean-out at Marylands, Christchurch. It has also been suggested that McGrath and Moloney were moved on because of the sexual allegations and that I put Brother Timothy (Boxall) in as Prior to bring about necessary changes. This is in a sense correct."

Royal Commission into Institutional Responses to Child Sexual Abuse (Australia) 
The commission were unable to conduct a public hearing into the order because of the risk of prejudicing the trials of Bernard McGrath and Brother John Clegg. Clegg was found guilty in 2015 of multiple offences against boys at Kendall Grange.

The commission held private hearings from survivors and families who suffered as a result of the order.

Royal Commission of Inquiry into Abuse in Care (New Zealand) 
As part of the investigation into abuse in the care of the Catholic Church, the New Zealand inquiry will investigate the nature and extent of the abuse that occurred at Marylands School, Christchurch. One accuser, Donald Daniel Ku, would testify before the Commission in February 2022, claiming that McGrath sexually abused him in 1963 while he was a student Marylands School and also put him in a coffin containing a dead body. Other accusers who were former students at Marylands School would testify before the Commission as well.

Police 
In December 2020, the detectives of Strike Force Lozano were awarded for their work on the McGrath case. Detective Darren Webster and Detective Scott Selkirk were identified as conducting the best investigations in New South Wales.

Revelation television documentary series 
In 2019, journalist Sarah Ferguson and producer Nial Fulton gained access to the Sydney District Court to film McGrath's fifth trial as part of the ABC television series Revelation. They also negotiated access to interview McGrath in his maximum security prison in New South Wales. During this interview, McGrath admitted that the order had covered up his abusing for decades and moved him to prevent scandal and police investigation. He said he understood that both he and Roger Moloney were moved from Christchurch in 1977 because of their sexual offending against children.

McGrath told Ferguson he had confessed his sexual abuse of children to Father Brian Lucas and Brother Joseph Smith in 1992 but neither man reported it to the police. McGrath explained how Smith personally delivered him to a treatment centre in Jemez Springs, New Mexico, despite Smith being aware of at least four allegations of child sexual abuse against McGrath.

McGrath also alleged he had been sexually abused by two other brothers in the order and described a toxic culture of sexual abuse, concealment and fear.

Offenders from the St John of God order 
In addition to McGrath, other members of the St John of God order have been convicted of child sexual abuse. They include:

See also 

Congregation of the Servants of the Paraclete

References 

Catholic Church sexual abuse scandals in Australia
Living people
People from Christchurch
Child abuse in Australia
Rape in Australia
Incidents of violence against boys
History of Christchurch
Religion in Christchurch
Catholic Church sexual abuse scandals in New Zealand
2000s in Christchurch
Crime in Christchurch
Sexual abuse cover-ups
20th-century New Zealand Roman Catholic priests
Australian people convicted of child sexual abuse
Australian people convicted of indecent assault
Catholic priests convicted of child sexual abuse
1947 births